Majed Abu Sidu (born 1 November 1985) is a Palestinian footballer who plays as a defender. Abu Sidu is a member of the Palestine national football team and participated in the 2010 FIFA World Cup qualifying.

References

1985 births
Living people
Palestinian footballers
Al Salmiya SC players
Palestinian expatriate footballers
Palestinian expatriate sportspeople in Kuwait
Expatriate footballers in Kuwait
Footballers at the 2006 Asian Games
Association football defenders
Asian Games competitors for Palestine
Palestine international footballers
Kuwait Premier League players
Al Tadhamon SC players
Burgan SC players
Al-Yarmouk SC (Kuwait) players
Kazma SC players